Longden is a surname, and may refer to:

 Ann Eliza Longden (1869–1952), British politician, first woman to serve as Lord Mayor of Sheffield
 Billy Longden (born c. 1867), English footballer
 Colin Longden (born 1933), English professional footballer
 Cyril Chapman Longden (1874–1913), English colonial administrator
 Deric Longden (1936–2013), English writer and autobiographer
 Duncan Longden (1826–1904), British army officer and politician
 Fred Longden (1889–1952), British politician 
 Gilbert Longden (1902–1997), British politician
 James Robert Longden (1827–1891), English colonial administrator
 John Longden (1900–1971), English film actor
 John Longden (Mormon) (1898–1969), general authority of The Church of Jesus Christ of Latter-day Saints
 Johnny Longden (1907–2003), Anglo-American Hall jockey
 Paul Longden (born 1962), English footballer
 Robert Longden (1817–1895), English clergyman and cricketer
 Robert Longden (born 1951), actor and librettist
 Sean Longden (born 1965), English author and historian 
 Vance Longden (1930–2003), American horse trainer

See also
Longden, English village
Longdon (disambiguation)